Home equity is the market value of a homeowner's unencumbered interest in their real property, that is, the difference between the home's fair market value and the outstanding balance of all liens on the property. The property's equity increases as the debtor makes payments against the mortgage balance, or as the property value appreciates. In economics, home equity is sometimes called real property value.

Home equity is not liquid. Home equity management refers to the process of using equity extraction via loans, at favorable, and often tax-favored, interest rates, to invest otherwise illiquid equity in a target that offers higher returns.

Homeowners acquire equity in their home from two sources.  They purchase equity with their down payment and the principal portion of any payments they make against their mortgage.  They also benefit from a gain in equity when the value of the property increases.  Investors typically look to purchase properties that will grow in value, causing the equity in the property to increase, thus providing a return on their investment when the property is sold.

Home equity may serve as collateral for a home equity loan or home equity line of credit. Many home equity plans set a fixed period during which the homeowner can borrow money, such as ten years. At the end of this “draw period,” the borrower may be allowed to renew the credit line. If the plan does not allow renewals, the borrower will not be able to borrow additional money once the period has ended. Some plans may call for payment in full of any outstanding balance at the end of the period. Others may allow repayment over a fixed period, for example, ten years.

See also
Home equity loan
Ownership equity

References

Personal finance
Real estate